The Ghana Health Service (GHS) is a Ghanaian government body established in 1996 as part of the Health Sector Reform of Ghana. The Health Service is under the Ministry of Health. The Health service primarily administrates the health services provided by the government and in implementing government policies on healthcare. The Director-General of the Health service is Dr. Patrick Kuma-Aboagye.

History
The Ghana Health Service (GHS) is a Public Service body established under Act 525 of 1996 as required by the 1992 constitution. It is an autonomous Executive Agency responsible for implementation of national policies under the control of the Ghana Minister for Health through its governing Council - the Ghana Health Service Council.

The GHS continue to receive public funds and thus remain within the public sector.  However, its employees are no longer part of the civil service, and GHS managers are no longer required to follow all civil service rules and procedures. The independence of the GHS is designed primarily to ensure that staffs have a greater degree of managerial flexibility to carry out their responsibilities then would be possible if they remained wholly within the civil service.

Ghana Health Service does not include Teaching Hospitals, Private and Mission Hospitals. The establishment of the Ghana Health Service was an essential part of the key strategies identified in the Ghana Health Sector Reform process, as outlined in the Medium Term Health Strategy (MTHS), which were necessary steps in establishing a more equitable, efficient, accessible and responsive health care system.

The reforms build on the reorganization of the MOH that began in 1993, was explicitly designed to set the scene for the establishment of the Ghana Health Service.  The reforms also provide a sound organizational framework for the growing degree of managerial responsibility that has already been delegated to districts and hospitals. Themes that were central to the reorganization of 1993 remain important today for the Ghana Health Service: careful stewardship of resources, clear lines of responsibility and control, decentralization, and accountability for performance rather than inputs.

GHS Mandate and Objectivity
GHS to provide and prudently manage comprehensive and accessible health service with special emphasis on primary health care at Ghana regional, district and sub-district levels in accordance with approved national policies. The objects of the Service are to:

Implement approved national policies for health delivery in Ghana.
Increase access to good quality health services, and
Manage prudently resources available for the provision of the health services.

GHS Functions
For the purposes of achieving its objectives the GHS performs the following functions amongst others:

Provide comprehensive health services at all levels in Ghana directly and by contracting out to other Ghana agencies. As part of this function, the GHS is:

Develop appropriate strategies and set technical guidelines to achieve Ghana national policy goals/objectives.
Undertake management and administration of the overall Ghana health resources within the service.
Promote healthy mode of living and good health habits by people in Ghana.
Establish effective mechanism for disease surveillance, prevention and control in Ghana.
Determine charges for Ghana health services with the approval of the Ghana Minister of Health.
Provide in-service training and continuing education in Ghana.
Perform any other functions relevant to the promotion, protection and restoration of health in Ghana.

Director-General 
Prof. Agyeman Badu Akosa (2002–2006)

Dr. Elias K. Sory (2007–2012)

Dr. Ebenezer Appiah-Denkyira (2012–2017)

Dr. Anthony Nsiah-Asare (2017–2019)

Dr. Patrick Kuma-Aboagye (2019–present)

Regional Directorates and Directors 
The following are the Directorates and Directors within the Ghana Health Service across the regions.

Ashanti Region

Regional Director: Dr. Emmanuel Tinkorang 
Districts
 Asanti Akyem
 Sekyere West
 Sekyere East
 offinso
 Obuasi
 Kwabre

Brong Ahafo Region

Regional Director: Dr. Kofi Issah
Districts:
 Wenchi
 Techiman
 Tano South
 Tano North
 Tain
 Sunyani

Central Region

Regional Director: Dr. Alexis Nang-Beifubah

Districts
 Upper Denkyira
 Twifu-Hemang-Lower-Denkyira
 Twifo-Hemang-Lower-Denkyira
 Mfantseman
 Komenda-Edina-Eguafo-Abirem
 Gomoa

Eastern Region

Regional Director 
Districts:

 Yilo Krobo
 West Akim
 Upper Manya
 Suhum Kraboa Coaltar
 New Juaben Municipal
 New Juaben
 Lower Manya

Greater Accra Region

Regional Director: Dr. Charity Sarpong
Districts

 Tema Municipal
 Ga West
 Ga East
 Ga South
 Weija/Gbawe
 Dangme West
 Dangme East
 Accra Metropolitan

Northern Region

Regional Director: Dr. John Eleeza 
Districts

 Zabzugu-Tatale
 Yendi
 West Mamprusi
 West Gonja
 Tolon-Kumbungu
 Tamale Metropolitan

Upper East

Regional Director: Dr. Winfred Ofosu  
Districts
Talensi Nabdam
 Navrongo
 Kassen-Nankana West
 Kassena-Nankana
 Builsa
 Talensi

Upper West

Regional Director: Dr. Damien Punguyire 
Districts

 Wa West
 Wa Municipal
 Wa East
 Nadowli-Kaleo
 Sissala West
 Sissala East
 Nandom
 Jirapa
 Lawra 
 Daffiama Bussie Issa (DBI)
 Lambussie

Volta Region

Regional Director: Dr. Timothy Letsa  
Districts
 South Tongu
 South Dayi
 North Tongu
 Nkwanta
 Krachi West
 Krachi East

Western Region 
Regional Director: Dr. Jacob Y. Mahama

Districts

 Wassa-Amenfi West
 Wassa-Amenfi East
 Wassa West
 Wassa Amenfi East
 Shama Ahanta East
 Sefwi Wiawso

Awards/Achievements 

 The Ghana Health Service (GHS) won 3 awards at the 2nd edition of the Africa Public Sector Conference and Awards (APSCA) event held in Accra. Leaders at the two-day event engaged in the public and private sectors from across Africa met to discuss key issues pertaining to public interest, share best practices, experiences and provide opportunities to build partnerships as well as to celebrate outstanding achievements in the African public sector and to lift the veil on exceptional public servants who have made Africa proud. Among the awards won are the following:
Outstanding Contribution to Public Service (Health Service)
 Public Sector Agency of the Year Award
 Most Innovative Public Sector Project of the Year (Drone Project).

References

External links
Ghana Health Service homepage

Medical and health organisations based in Ghana
Government of Ghana